The 1983 ECAC Metro men's basketball tournament (now known as the Northeast Conference men's basketball tournament) was held March 9–12. The quarterfinal and semifinal rounds were played on campus sites with the championship game held at John Jay Center in Moon Township, Pennsylvania. 

Robert Morris defeated  in the championship game, 79–67, to win back-to-back ECAC Metro men's basketball tournaments. The Colonials earned the automatic bid to the 1983 NCAA Tournament.

Bracket

References

Northeast Conference men's basketball tournament
Tournament
ECAC Metro men's basketball tournament
ECAC Metro men's basketball tournament